Slim Harpo (born James Isaac Moore; January 11, 1924 – January 31, 1970) was an American blues musician, a leading exponent of the swamp blues style, and "one of the most commercially successful blues artists of his day". He played guitar and was a master of the blues harmonica, known in blues circles as a "harp". His most successful and influential recordings included "I'm a King Bee" (1957), "Rainin' in My Heart" (1961), and "Baby Scratch My Back" (1966), which reached number one on Billboard's R&B chart and number 16 on its broader Hot 100 singles chart.

Life and career
Moore was born in Lobdell, Louisiana, the eldest child in his family. After his parents died he worked as a longshoreman and construction worker in New Orleans in the late 1930s and early 1940s. Influenced in style by Jimmy Reed, he began performing in Baton Rouge bars using the name "Harmonica Slim", and also accompanied his brother-in-law Lightnin' Slim in live performances.

He started his recording career in March 1957, working with the A&R man and record producer J. D. "Jay" Miller in Crowley, Louisiana. To differentiate himself from another performer called Harmonica Slim he took his wife's suggestion and adopted the name Slim Harpo. His first solo release, for Excello Records, based in Nashville, Tennessee, was "I'm a King Bee", backed with "I Got Love If You Want It" in 1957. Harpo played guitar in his live shows, but he usually used other guitarists when recording. The record was a regional hit, but failed to make the national charts. He followed up with several more singles for Excello before having his first chart hit, "Rainin' in My Heart", in early 1961.  The record reached number 17 on Billboard's R&B chart and number 34 on its Hot 100, and it was followed soon after with an album of the same name and additional singles. Many of his songs were co-written with his wife, Lovelle Moore, although she never received credit.

Never a full-time musician, Harpo owned a trucking business during the 1960s. According to writer Ryan Whirty, "Harpo and his band needed to tour constantly and play as much as possible; times were frequently lean financially, and the men had to scrape up whatever they could get." But, by 1964, several of his songs had been released on albums and singles in the UK, and British rock bands began to include versions of his songs in their early repertoires.  British Merseybeat/R&B group The Moody Blues reportedly took their name from an instrumental track of Slim's called "Moody Blues". Critic Cub Koda wrote of his appeal: 

He had his biggest commercial success in 1966, when the predominantly instrumental "Baby Scratch My Back" reached number one on the R&B chart and number 16 on the broader chart.   Harpo described it as "an attempt at rock & roll for me" and was again produced by Miller.  However, disagreements with Miller and a change in the record company's ownership led to two follow-ups, "Tip On In" and "Tee-Ni-Nee-Ni-Nu", being recorded in Nashville with new producer Robert Holmes.  Both made the R&B charts.

He recruited Lightnin' Slim for his touring band in 1968, and toured widely in the late 1960s, mainly reaching rock audiences.  With his first scheduled tour of Europe and recording sessions already planned, "one of the cleanest living bluesmen of his era" died suddenly of a heart attack in Baton Rouge in January 1970 just 20 days after his 46th birthday. He was buried in Mulatto Bend Cemetery in Port Allen, Louisiana.

Influence
Music critic Cub Koda noted that his songs "also proved to be quite adaptable for white artists on both sides of the Atlantic, including the Rolling Stones, Yardbirds, Kinks, Dave Edmunds with Love Sculpture, Van Morrison with Them, Sun rockabilly singer Warren Smith, Hank Williams, Jr., and the Fabulous Thunderbirds".  The Slim Harpo Music Awards, awarded annually in Baton Rouge, are named in his honor. Proceeds from the awards benefit the "Music in the Schools" outreach program.

A biography, titled Slim Harpo: Blues King Bee of Baton Rouge, by UK blues scholar Martin Hawkins was published in 2006. David Fricke of Rolling Stone magazine described the book as "a passionate, encyclopedic triumph, bringing the enigmatic Harpo to life and tracing his remarkable mainstream ascensionfrom the rich central-Louisiana blues scene to gigs at the Fillmore Eastwith deep local research and detailed portraits of the singer's peers, sidemen and record-business associates."

Discography

Singles
 1957 - "I'm a King Bee" / "I Got Love if You Want It" (Excello 2113)
 1958 - "Wondering and Worryin'" / "Strange Love" (Excello 2138)
 1959 - "You'll Be Sorry One Day" / "One More Day" (Excello 2162)
 1960 - "Buzz Me Babe" / "Late Last Night" (Excello 2171)
 1960 - "Blues Hangover" / "What a Dream" (Excello 2184)
 1961 - "Rainin' in My Heart" / "Don't Start Cryin' Now" (Excello 2194) - R&B chart #17, US pop chart #34
 1963 - "I Love the Life I'm Living" / "Buzzin'" (Excello 2239)
 1964 - "I Need Money (Keep Your Alibis)" / "My Little Queen Bee (Got a Brand New King)" (Excello 2246)
 1964 - "Still Rainin' in My Heart" / "We're Two of a Kind" (Excello 2253)
 1964 - "Sittin' Here Wondering" / "What's Goin' on Baby" (Excello 2261)
 1964 - "Harpo's Blues" / "Please Don't Turn Me Down" (Excello 2265)
 1966 - "Baby Scratch My Back" / "I'm Gonna Miss You (Like The Devil)" (Excello 2273) - R&B chart #1, US pop chart #16
 1966 - "Shake Your Hips" / "Midnight Blues" (Excello 2278)
 1966 - "I'm Your Bread Maker, Baby" / "Loving You (The Way I Do)" (Excello 2282)
 1967 - "Tip On In (Part 1)" / "Tip On In (Part 2)" (Excello 2285) - R&B chart #37
 1967 - "I'm Gonna Keep What I've Got" / "I've Got To Be With You Tonight" (Excello 2289)
 1968 - "Te-Ni-Nee-Ni-Nu" / "Mailbox Blues" (Excello 2294) - R&B chart #36
 1968 - "Mohair Sam" / "I Just Can't Leave You" (Excello 2301)
 1968 - "That's Why I Love You" / "Just For You" (Excello 2305)
 1968 - "Folsom Prison Blues" / "Mutual Friend" (Excello 2306)
 1968 - "I've Got My Finger on Your Trigger" / "The Price Is Too High" (Excello 2309)
 1969 - "Rainin' in My Heart" (reissue) / "Jody Man" (Excello 2316)

Albums
 1960 - Tunes to Be Remembered (one track; various artists - Excello LPS-8001)
 1961 - Raining in My Heart (Excello LPS-8003) (CD release: Hip-O/MCA 40135, 1998 - with 3 bonus tracks)
 1963 - Authentic R & B (three tracks; various artists - UK Stateside SL-10068)
 1964 - The Real R & B (three tracks; various artists - UK Stateside SL-10112)
 1964 - A Long Drink of Blues (six tracks...all of side 2; compilation album shared with Lightnin' Slim - UK Stateside SL-10135)
 1966 - Baby Scratch My Back (Excello LPS-8005)
 1968 - Tip On In (Excello LPS-8008)
 1968 - Saturday Night Function: Rural Blues, Vol. 2 (two tracks; various artists - Imperial LM-94001)
 1969 - The Best of Slim Harpo (compilation album - Excello LPS-8010)
 1969 - The Real Blues (one track; various artists - Excello LPS-8011)
 1970 - Slim Harpo Knew the Blues (Excello LPS-8013)
 1970 - He Knew the Blues (Blue Horizon S7-63854; UK version of Excello LPS-8013 with two extra tracks: "Shake Your Hips" and "I'm Your Bread Maker Baby")
 1971 - Trigger Finger (UK Blue Horizon 2431 013)
 1972 - The Excello Story (three tracks; various artists - Excello LPS-8025) 2LP
 1976 - Slim Harpo...Knew the Blues (Vol. 2) (Excello/Nashboro 28030) 2LP/25 tracks compilation of LPS-8008, LPS-8013, and four singles: Excello 2301, 2305, 2306, 2309; plus one previously unreleased track: "Stick Your Chest Out Baby".
 1978 - Slim Harpo...He Knew the Blues (Sonet SNTF-769) single LP/14 tracks sampler of Excello 28030.

Compilation albums
 1989 -  Scratch My Back: The Best of Slim Harpo (The Original King Bee) (Rhino 70169)
 1989 -  I'm a King Bee (Flyright FLYCD-05) 
 1993 -  The Best of Slim Harpo (Ace Records CDCHM-410) 
 1994 -  I'm a King Bee (Ace CDCHD-510) 
 1995 -  Hip Shakin': The Excello Collection (Excello/AVI 2001) 2CD
 1995 -  Shake Your Hips (Ace CDCHD-558) 
 1996 -  Tip On In (Ace CDCHD 606) 
 1996 -  The Scratch: Rare and Unissued, Volume 1 (Excello/AVI 3015)
 1997 -  Sting It Then! (Ace CDCHD-658) -note: live recording from 1961.
 1997 -  The Best of Slim Harpo (Hip-O/MCA 40072)
 2003 -  The Excello Singles Anthology (Hip-O/UMe B0000583 02) 2CD
 2011 -  Slim Harpo Rocks (Bear Family BCD-17129)
 2015 -  Buzzin' the Blues: The Complete Slim Harpo (Bear Family BCD-17339) 5-CD box set

Notes

References

External links
 
 

1924 births
1970 deaths
African-American guitarists
American blues guitarists
American male guitarists
American blues singers
American blues harmonica players
Blues revival musicians
Harmonica blues musicians
Juke Joint blues musicians
Louisiana blues musicians
Electric blues musicians
Swamp blues musicians
Musicians from Baton Rouge, Louisiana
Blues musicians from Louisiana
20th-century American guitarists
Singers from Louisiana
Guitarists from Louisiana
People from West Baton Rouge Parish, Louisiana
Excello Records artists
20th-century African-American male singers